The Lady of All Nations is a Catholic Marian title sometimes associated with apparitions of the Blessed Virgin Mary to Ida Peerdeman of Amsterdam, Netherlands. Peerdeman claimed to have received 56 visions of the Lady from 1945 to 1959.

The visionary 

Ida Peerdeman was born on 13 August 1905 in the city of Alkmaar, Netherlands, the youngest of five children. She was an ordinary woman who worked as a secretary in Amsterdam. On 25 March 1945, Peerdeman reported seeing a woman surrounded in light who identified herself as "The Lady" and "Mother". The apparitions continued until 31 May 1959.

Peerdeman's movement received support from a member of the wealthy Brenninkmeijer family. In December 1979, The Lady of All Nations Foundation purchased property in Diepenbrockstraat, Amsterdam, which became the center of the apparition cultus, and where Peerdeman came to reside. She spent the rest of her life promoting the messages she claimed to have received. She died on 17 June 1996.

Messages
According to Peerdeman, the first apparition occurred at her home in Amsterdam on March 25, 1945 when she saw a light from which a woman appeared. When Peerdeman asked the woman if she was Mary, the woman replied, "They will call me 'The Lady'." The initial twenty-five messages were generally apocalyptic pronouncements warning of dangers such as communism and atheism.

After the promulgation of the dogma of the Assumption in 1950, the messages changed. "On November 1, 1950, Pope Pius XII proclaimed the dogma of the Assumption of Mary into Heaven. This event constitutes a noteworthy point within the messages, for from here they take on a new direction. In this, the first message to follow the proclamation of the dogma, Mary calls herself 'The Lady of All Nations' for the first time. In the succeeding messages she dictates her prayer, draws attention to her image, and speaks for the first time about the final and greatest Marian dogma: Mary Coredemptrix, Mediatrix and Advocate."

The Lady reportedly said that the definition of the Assumption had brought to a close the era of Marian dogmas having to do with Mary's earthly life, and that the "final and greatest" Marian dogma would be a definition of the heavenly role of the Lady of All Nations under the titles of Coredemptrix, Mediatrix and Advocate. Supporters of this proposal refer to it as "the fifth Marian dogma," since it would theoretically follow the four dogmatic definitions of Mary as Mother of God, Perpetual Virgin, Immaculately Conceived, and Assumed into Heaven.

In February 1951, the Lady of the apparition reportedly began identifying herself in a different way: "I am the Lady, Mary, Mother of All Nations. You may say: The Lady of All Nations or Mother of All Nations, who once was Mary." The following month the lady said, "The whole world is degenerating, and because of this the Son is sending the Lady of All Nations, who once was Mary." In July, she explained, "'Who once was Mary" means: many people have known Mary as Mary. Now, however, in this new era which is about to begin, I wish to be the Lady of All Nations." Peerdeman's apparition messages cite the Gospel of John as the basis of this dual naming of Mary: "At the departure of the Lord Jesus Christ, He gave Miriam, or Mary, to the nations in one act, giving her as 'The Lady of All Nations'. For He spoke the words, 'Woman, behold your son; son, behold your mother.' One act, and by this Miriam, or Mary, received this new title."

The Lady asked a prayer be said throughout the world:

The use of the phrase "who once was Mary" was immediately controversial. Peerdeman's bishop edited the prayer to remove the phrase, but relented after Peerdeman reported that the Lady was not happy with this change. In 2005, the Congregation for the Doctrine of the Faith ordered that the phrase "who once was Mary" be replaced with the phrase "the Blessed Virgin Mary" for pastoral reasons.

Development
The apparition directed that a picture of her be distributed throughout the world. The painting was made in 1951 by artist Heinrich Repke. Small prints were widely disseminated. The picture depicts Mary standing in front of a large wooden cross. Christ is not represented. According to Margry, the image caused controversy by appearing to suggest that Mary had replaced Christ as co-redemptrix. Adherents of the Amsterdam cultus began to press for the promulgation of a fifth dogma.

Despite a declaration by the Bishop of Haarlem that he "found no evidence of the supernatural nature of the apparitions", the movement continued to spread. In March 1973, Marie-Paule Giguère, founder of the Army of Mary, met Peerdeman in Amsterdam.

Rulings by Church authorities 

In the Catholic Church, the task of judging the supernatural character of an alleged apparition normally falls to the bishop of the diocese in which the apparition takes place: in this case, the Diocese of Haarlem-Amsterdam (formerly known as the Diocese of Haarlem).

 Bishop Johannes Huibers, who was bishop of Haarlem while the apparitions were taking place, gave his approval (nihil obstat) to the title and the prayer associated with the apparition. "On 7 May 1956, Bishop Huibers, following on a careful examination of the case concerning the supposed apparitions and revelations of 'Our Lady of All Nations', declared that he 'found no evidence of the supernatural nature of the apparitions'". The Vatican's Congregation for the Doctrine of the Faith (CDF) affirmed his position on 13 March 1957 and again on 24 May 1972 and 25 May 1974.
 On 31 May 1996, Bishop Hendrik Bomers, with permission of the CDF, permitted public veneration using the title, prayer, and image, while maintaining that the question of the supernatural character of the apparitions themselves was unresolved and left to the judgment of one's own conscience. He reiterated his support in a letter dated 3 December 1997.
 On 31 May 2002, Bishop Jozef Marianus Punt declared the apparitions themselves to be of supernatural origin. (Since that time, there has been debate as to whether Bishop Punt had authority to overturn his predecessor's decision, given that his predecessor's decision was confirmed by the CDF.)
 In a letter dated August 8, 2005, the secretary of the CDF acknowledged that "the said apparitions have received approval from His Excellency the Most Rev. Joseph Maria Punt," but expressed the CDF's request that the prayer associated with the apparition be edited, replacing the words "who once was Mary" with "the Blessed Virgin Mary".
 In a letter dated July 20, 2020, under the label Prot. N. 2353/20, sent from the Apostolic Nunciature to Lebanon to the Maronites' Patriarch of Antioch cardinal Bechara Boutros Rahi following his request about the actual official position of the Church regarding the devotion to the Virgin Mary as 'Lady of all Nations', and after asking the Congregation for the Doctrine of the Faith for clarification. The aforementioned Doctrinary Dicastery pointed out that the Notification published on May 25, 1974, available on its web page, is still valid today. It states that, after suitable study, "it did not consist of the supernatural nature of the apparitions". Therefore, the faithful are invited to "cease all propaganda about the alleged apparitions and revelations of the 'Lady of all Nations', and urged "to express their devotion to the Virgin saint as Queen of the Universe [...] with recognized forms recommended by the Church". The letter from the Congregation itself to the Episcopal Conference in Philippines of May 20, 2005, does not contain anything that could suggest a changed opinion of the Dicastery on the matter. All this well considered, the Congregation for the Doctrine of the Faith is of the opinion that it is not convenient to contribute to the spreading of the veneration of Mary as 'Lady of all Nations'.
 On January 4, 2021, "the Vatican's doctrinal office has urged Catholics not to promote 'the alleged apparitions and revelations' associated with the Marian title of 'Lady of all Nations'," according to a Dutch bishop. The Congregation for the Doctrine of the Faith's appeal was announced in a clarification issued December 30 by Bishop Johannes Willibrordus Maria Hendriks of Haarlem-Amsterdam. Hendriks, who as the local bishop is primarily responsible for evaluating the apparitions, said that he had decided to issue the statement after consulting with the Vatican's doctrinal congregation, which guides bishops in the discernment process.

Commentary
Peerdeman's account was one of four apparitions claimed to have taken place in the Netherlands between 1937 and 1950. Dutch historian and ethnologist Peter Jan Margry sees the popular spread of the cultus arising from a reaction on the part of traditional or conservative believers (originally among Dutch Catholics), to the movement for renewal and liberalization in the 1970s in the Church establishment.

See also
 Community of the Lady of All Nations

Notes

References

External links
 The Lady of All Nations

Marian apparitions
1945 in the Netherlands
All Nations